Alfredo Horacio Núñez Mendoza (16 February 1960 – 15 March 2008) was a Chilean footballer. 

Núñez was a member of the Chile team at the 1984 Olympic Games. At senior level, he made three appearances and scored one goal.

References

External links
 Alfredo Núñez at MemoriaWanderers.cl 

1960 births
2008 deaths
People from Tomé
Chilean footballers
Chilean expatriate footballers
Chile international footballers
Deportes Iberia footballers
Trasandino footballers
Malleco Unido footballers
Club Deportivo Palestino footballers
Atlas F.C. footballers
Deportes La Serena footballers
Naval de Talcahuano footballers
Everton de Viña del Mar footballers
Unión La Calera footballers
Santiago Wanderers footballers
San Luis de Quillota footballers
Primera B de Chile players
Chilean Primera División players
Liga MX players
Tercera División de Chile players
Chilean expatriate sportspeople in Mexico
Expatriate footballers in Mexico
Olympic footballers of Chile
Footballers at the 1984 Summer Olympics
Association football midfielders
Chilean football managers
Unión La Calera managers
Unión San Felipe managers
San Luis de Quillota managers
Primera B de Chile managers